LDB may refer to:
Lake railway station, Isle of Wight, from its National Rail code
Land development bank, a type of bank in India
Liga de Desenvolvimento de Basquete, a Brazilian under-22 basketball league
The Little Drummer Boy, a Christmas song, especially in the context of the Little Drummer Boy Challenge, an attempt to avoid hearing the song.
Liquor Distribution Branch, a governmental body responsible for regulating and monitoring the liquor industry in British Columbia, Canada
Lordsburg (Amtrak station), Lordsburg, New Mexico, from its Amtrak code
Long duration ballooning, a program of the Columbia Scientific Balloon Facility
The Louis D. Brandeis Center for Human Rights under Law (LDB), an organization that advances the civil and human rights of the Jewish people and promotes justice for all
Kelton "LDB" Kessee (born 1981), drummer of the American R&B group IMx